Kosmiic Chat is an Indian talk show created and produced by Ekta Kapoor and Shobha Kapoor under their banner Balaji Telefilms. The series premiered on 19 September 2004 on Zoom.

Plot
The series is a talk show where chats revolving generational shift in 21st century, the youth their habits, changing tastes and behaviour are discussed.

Cast 
 Sunita Menon
 Simone Singh
 Rohit Roy

References

External links 
 Official Website

Balaji Telefilms television series
2004 Indian television series debuts
Zoom (Indian TV channel) original programming
Indian television talk shows